Udea aurora is a moth of the family Crambidae. It is endemic to the Hawaiian islands of Kauai and Oahu.

The larvae feed on Bidens species. They feed between spun-together leaves. The pupa is about 10 mm long.

External links

Moths described in 1881
Endemic moths of Hawaii
aurora